Macrozelima is a genus of hoverfly in the family Syrphidae.

Species
Macrozelima hervei (Shiraki, 1930)
Macrozelima scripta Hippa, 1978

References

Hoverfly genera
Eristalinae
Diptera of Asia
Taxa named by Aleksandr Stackelberg